The 2008 IIHF World Women's U18 Championship was the inaugural junior female world ice hockey championship. It was held from 7 to 12 January 2008, in Calgary, Alberta, Canada. The championship is the junior ice hockey version of the women worlds, held under the auspices of the IIHF.

The inaugural competition featured two groups of nations in round robin play, followed by playoffs. There were eight national teams.

Teams

The following teams participated in the championship:

Format
The eight participating teams are divided up into two seeded groups as below. The teams will play each other once in a single round robin format. The top two teams from the group will proceed to the medal round, while the remaining teams will play in the placing games.

Preliminary round
All times are local (UTC–7).

Group A

Group B

Placement round

Bracket

5–8th place semifinals

7th place game

5th place game

Final round

Bracket

Semifinals

Bronze medal game

Gold medal game

Ranking and statistics

Final standings

Scoring leaders
List shows the top skaters sorted by points, then goals. If the list exceeds 10 skaters because of a tie in points, all of the tied skaters are shown.
GP = Games played; G = Goals; A = Assists; Pts = Points; +/− = Plus/minus; PIM = Penalties in minutes; POS = PositionSource: IIHF

Leading goaltenders
Only the top five goaltenders, based on save percentage, who have played 40% of their team's minutes are included in this list.
TOI = Time On Ice (minutes:seconds); SA = Shots against; GA = Goals against; GAA = Goals against average; Sv% = Save percentage; SO = ShutoutsSource: IIHF

Tournament awards
Best players selected by the directorate:
Best Goaltender:  Alyssa Grogan
Best Defenceman:  Lauriane Rougeau
Best Forward:  Marie-Philip Poulin

See also
 2007 IIHF World Women's U18 Championship Qualification
 2008 IIHF World U18 Championships (Men)
 2008 World Junior Ice Hockey Championships (Men)

Notes

References
 2010 IIHF World Women’s Under-18 Championship Team Canada Notes
 TSN.ca (Canadian Press) Hockey Canada names women's U-18 roster
 USA Hockey Women’s Under-18 Team Announced

External links
 Official site
 TSN.ca 2008 World Women's U-18 Championship
 Hockey Canada 2008 World Women's Under-18 Championship

IIHF World Women's U18 Championships
2008 in ice hockey
International ice hockey competitions hosted by Canada
World
World
January 2008 sports events in Canada
2000s in Calgary
Ice hockey competitions in Calgary
2008 in Alberta